Veli Saltikgil (1880 – 21 March 1935), also known as Veli Bey and Veliddin,  was a Turkish general and politician. He was the commander of the Eastern Army of Turkey & a signatory of the Treaty of Kars, he later served in the justice department in Aydın, he was a member of the Grand National Assembly of Turkey.

See also
 Treaty of Kars

References

 

1880 births
1935 deaths
Ottoman military personnel of World War I
Ottoman Army generals
Turkish Army generals
Turkish military personnel of the Turkish–Armenian War
Burials at Turkish State Cemetery